Ustka railway station is in Ustka in the Pomeranian Voivodeship, Poland. According to the PKP classification the station is category D, meaning it has fewer than 300,000 passengers annually.

Train services
The station is served by the following services:

Intercity services (IC) Ustka - Koszalin - Poznań - Wrocław - Opole - Bielsko-Biała
Intercity services (IC) Ustka - Koszalin - Poznań - Wrocław - Katowice - Kraków - Rzeszów - Przemyśl
Regional services (R) Słupsk — Ustka Uroczysko

References

External links

Railway stations in Pomeranian Voivodeship
Railway stations in Poland opened in 1911